Aechmea leptantha is a species of flowering plant in the genus Aechmea. This species is endemic to eastern Brazil, known from the States of Paraíba and Pernambuco.

Cultivars
 x Portemea 'Lepitana'

References

leptantha
Flora of Brazil
Plants described in 1929